Trilinear may refer to:

 Trilinear filtering, a method in computer graphics for choosing the color of a texture
 Trilinear form, a type of mathematical function from a vector space to the underlying field
 Trilinear interpolation, an extension of linear interpolation for interpolating functions of three variables on a rectilinear 3D grid
 Trilinear map, a type of mathematical function between vector spaces
 Trilinear coordinates
 Trilinear polarity, in geometry